The Chinatown Historic District is a neighborhood of Honolulu, Hawaii, known for its Chinese American community. It is one of the oldest Chinatowns in the United States.

Geography
There is conflicting information about the boundaries that make up Chinatown. One source identifies the natural boundary to the west as Honolulu Harbor, and to the north, Nuuanu stream. Beretania Street is usually considered the eastern boundary, and the southern boundary is Nuuanu Avenue, although the Chinatown Special District is considered to extend approximately a block and a half south of Nuuanu along Merchant Street. A few blocks to the east is the Hawaii Capital Historic District, and adjacent to the south is the Merchant Street Historic District.

Alternatively, the Hawaiian language newspaper Nupepa Kuokoa described Taona Pake (Chinatown) in 1900 as "that whole area from West side of Kukui Street until the river mouth called Makaaho, then travel straight until reaching Hotel street; and travel on [Hotel] this street on the West side until reaching Konia Street, and travel until you reach King St.

Locations

Since 2002, there are two small paifang on the sidewalks flanking North King Street, just north of where King crosses Nuuanu Stream, and just south of where Hotel splits from King. There is also a small brick entrance arch to Maunakea Marketplace off Maunakea Street, decorated with an awning featuring a green-tile roof. Two guardian lions mark the southern entrance to Chinatown on Hotel, between Bethel and Nuuanu near the Dr. Sun Yat-sen Memorial Park (formerly Chinatown Gateway Park); they were gifted to Honolulu by a sister city, Kaohsiung, in 1989. Dr. Sun was born in another of Honolulu's sister cities, Zhongshan.

The Wo Fat Restaurant was Honolulu's oldest. The business first opened in 1882, but the building was destroyed in the 1886 fire. A new building was built at 115 North Hotel Street after the 1900 fire, and the current three-story building at the same location opened in 1938, designed by Y.T. Char. The Wo Fat Restaurant closed in 2005, and the building housed a nightclub in the early 2000s.

In 1904, the Oahu Market was opened by Tuck Young at the corner of King and Kekaulike streets, coordinates . The simply designed functional construction, consisting of a large, open-air, covered space divided into stalls, remains in use today for selling fresh fish and produce.

History
The area was probably used by fishermen in ancient Hawaii but little evidence of this remains. Kealiimaikai, the brother of Kamehameha I lived in the area at the end of the 18th century.

One of the first early settlers from outside was Isaac Davis, who lived there until 1810. Spaniard Don Francisco de Paula Marín lived in the southern end of the area in the early 19th century, and planted a vineyard in the northern end, for which Vineyard Boulevard is named.

During the 19th century laborers were imported from China to work on sugar plantations in Hawaii. Many became merchants after their contracts expired and moved to this area. The ethnic makeup has always been diverse, peaking at about 56% Chinese people in the 1900 census, and then declining. Honolulu is traditionally known in Chinese as 檀香山 (Tánxiāngshān), meaning Sandalwood Mountain.

Two major fires destroyed many buildings in 1886 and 1900. The 1886 fire started at 4 p.m. on April 18; according to contemporary news reports, the Chinese fire company was blamed for being unable to halt the progress and the fire consumed , destroying almost all of Chinatown, save two or three buildings. 8,000 residents were displaced.

The 1900 fire started during the destruction of a building infected with bubonic plague; the plague was confirmed in Honolulu on December 12, 1899. Schools were closed and 7000 residents of the area were put under quarantine. After 13 people died, the Board of Health ordered structures suspected of being infected to be burned. Residents were evacuated, and a few buildings were successfully destroyed while the Honolulu Fire Department stood by. However, on January 20, 1900, the fire went out of control after winds shifted, and destroyed most of the neighborhood instead. The neighborhood was rebuilt and many of the current buildings date from 1901. Very few are over four stories tall.

Bubonic Plague (1899–1900) 
King Kamehameha III created the Board of Health on December 13, 1850. This became the first Board of Health in the United States. It was established to supervise the public health of the people of Hawaii, and to protect them against epidemic diseases. The Board of Health, which at that time was under the control of three physicians, Nathaniel B. Emerson, Francis R. Day and Clifford B. Wood, played an integral role during the bubonic plague outbreak that started in 1899. The situation had become so dire in Honolulu that Emerson, Day and Wood were afforded absolute dictatorial authority over Hawaii. This was the result of an agreement between the President of the Provisional Hawaiian Government, Mr. Sanford Ballard Dole, and the Attorney General, Mr. Henry E. Cooper, who concurred that nothing should impede the battle of the "dread disease". Cooper also served as the President of the Board of Health.

According to the Annual Reports published by the Hawaii State Department of Health, the first case of the bubonic plague was Yon Chong, a 22-year-old Chinese man who worked as a bookkeeper in Chinatown. Chong fell sick on December 9, 1899, and formed buboes, leading his attending physician to suspect the plague. A jointly-conducted diagnostic exam was performed by other doctors, who confirmed the suspicion. Their diagnosis was reported to Board President Cooper on December 11, 1899. Yon Chong died the following day, and Cooper made an announcement to the public about this first bubonic plague death.

After the public announcement, Cooper ordered an immediate military quarantine of the Chinatown area. In hopes of containing the plague in Honolulu, the Board of Health also closed Honolulu Harbor to both incoming and outgoing vessels. According to the official Board of Health records, only three human cases of the plague were recorded during the quarantine. On December 19, 1899, the quarantine of Chinatown and Honolulu Harbor was lifted. However, only five days after the quarantine was lifted, nine more cases were reported by the Board of Health. Of those 12 reported cases, 11 would die.

The epidemic continued until March 31, 1900. By the end, a total of 71 cases and 61 fatalities were reported by Board of Health.

Yersinia pestis in Hawaii 
Yersinia pestis, the bacterium that causes bubonic plague, is transmitted by the oriental rat flea and has been historically propagated along various trade routes to the west from China. Although the original introduction of the oriental rat flea to Hawaii is unknown, one historical incident may mark this important event. In 1899, the Nippon Maru anchored in Honolulu Harbor en route to San Francisco, and reported the death of a Chinese passenger. After inspection, the ship had been confined to Quarantine Island, better known today as Sand Island. After a week-long stay there, the ship had been cleared to travel on to San Francisco. According to one record, due diligence was executed on the part of the Board of Health with respect to the passengers and goods, though little attention was paid to the chance of rats escaping and going ashore. This is because it was not yet widely known that the rodents were the carriers of the flea vector that transmits Yersinia pestis.

Great Honolulu Chinatown Fire of 1900

The bubonic plague was introduced into Honolulu on October 20, 1899, by an offloaded shipment of rice from the America Maru, which had also been carrying rats. At that time, Chinese immigration to Hawaii had resulted in crowded residences in Chinatown with poor living conditions and sewage disposal. Plague infected 11 people. The Board of Health responded by incinerating garbage, renovating the sewer system, putting Chinatown under quarantine, and most of all burning affected buildings. Forty-one fires were set in total, and on January 20, 1900, winds picked up one fire and spread it to other buildings. The fire burned out of control for seventeen days and scorched  of Honolulu. There were another 31 controlled burns after the incident. The 7,000 residents rendered homeless were housed in detention camps to maintain the quarantine until April 30. White residents who had gathered to watch the fire also helped escort the victims to refugee camps, using baseball bats and pick handles to ensure compliance. A total of 40 people died of the plague.

Rebuilding and preservation
Critics accused the government of Sinophobia. An exodus occurred. While the former residents rebuilt Chinatown, many moved to the suburbs, hoping not to relive a similar incident. The post-fire architecture used masonry rather than wood, since stone and brick buildings were fire resistant.

Many of the people who filed damage claims were represented by lawyer Paul Neumann, but he died before the cases went to court.

After World War II the area fell into disrepair and became a red-light district.

During the administrations of mayors Frank Fasi and Jeremy Harris the area was targeted for revitalization. Restrictions on lighting and signs were relaxed to promote nightlife. Special zoning rules were adopted for the area. The Hawaii National Bank was founded in the district in 1960, and has its headquarters there. About  of the district was added to the National Register of Historic Places listings in Oahu on January 17, 1973, as site 73000658.

On the eastern edge of the district, the Hawaii Theatre was restored and re-opened in 1996. The area around the theatre is called the Arts District. In 2005 a small park near the theatre at the corner of Hotel and Bethel streets was opened and named Chinatown Gateway Park. In November 2007 the park was renamed to honor Sun Yat-sen, who came to Chinatown in 1879; he was educated and planned the Chinese Revolution of 1911 during his Hawaiian stay.

Honolulu Chinatown was included in the Preserve America program.

Government and infrastructure

The Chinatown-Downtown Honolulu Neighborhood Board is an elected nine-member volunteer organization dedicated to improving the governance of this specially designated region. It is a part of the City and County of Honolulu Neighborhood Commission Office. Currently, the Board is chaired by Kevin McDonald and meets on the first Thursday of each month at 6 p.m. at the Aloha Tower, Multipurpose room #2.

The downtown police substation of the Honolulu Police Department is located in Chinatown. Officials broke ground for the substation on Friday September 18, 1998. Mayor Jeremy Harris said that he wanted a police station built at that location because the presence of a police station would deter crime.

Honolulu Rail Transit is anticipated to extend service to Chinatown by 2025; the future Chinatown station will be built in the median of Nimitz Highway between River and Kekaulike.

Popular culture
 The character Charlie Chan was based on detective Chang Apana (1871–1933). After a vacation to Honolulu in 1919, Earl Derr Biggers read about Apana and based the character there.
 The character Wo Fat in the TV series Hawaii Five-O was named after the eponymous restaurant in Honolulu's Chinatown.

References

Further reading

External links

 

Honolulu
Chinese-American culture in Honolulu
Chinese-American history
Historic districts on the National Register of Historic Places in Hawaii
Historical red-light districts in the United States
History of immigration to Hawaii
National Register of Historic Places in Honolulu
Neighborhoods in Honolulu
Red-light districts in Hawaii